Andrioplecta is a genus of moths belonging to the subfamily Olethreutinae of the family Tortricidae.

Species
Andrioplecta dierli Komai, 1992
Andrioplecta leucodora (Meyrick, 1928)
Andrioplecta oxystaura (Meyrick, in Caradja & Meyrick, 1935)
Andrioplecta phuluangensis Komai, 1992
Andrioplecta pulverula (Meyrick, 1912)
Andrioplecta rescissa (Meyrick, 1921)
Andrioplecta shoreae Komai, 1992
Andrioplecta suboxystaura Komai, 1992
Andrioplecta subpulverula (Obraztsov, 1968)

See also
List of Tortricidae genera

References

External links
tortricidae.com

Tortricidae genera
Olethreutinae